The Red River waterdog (Necturus louisianensis), also called Louisiana waterdog, is a species of aquatic salamander in the family Proteidae.

Taxonomy 
Some taxonomic authorities consider this salamander to be a subspecies of the common mudpuppy (N. maculosus) as N. maculosus louisianensis, or the Red River mudpuppy. The Red River waterdog was proposed as a separate species from the common mudpuppy by Collins in 1991 and 1997, but supporting data was lacking. Petranka (1998) and Crother (2000) both treated this animal as a subspecies. Phylogenetic and morphological analyses done by Chabbaria et al. 2018, confirmed them as being distinct species. However, some authorities still keep it as a subspecies.

Geographic range
It is found in southeastern Kansas, southern Missouri, northeastern Oklahoma, Arkansas, and northcentral Louisiana. It lives only in the Red River and adjacent drainage systems.

Description
It is much different in appearance from the common mudpuppy which is gray to brown, with round blue-black spots. The Red River mudpuppy is light yellowish brown with a white stripe on either side of the middorsal area.

Diet and behavior
It eats mainly small underwater animals. Its feathery gills mean that it can breathe only underwater not on land. It and many other mudpuppies can still go on land, but not for a very long time. They go on land only if the water is too dirty so they can find cleaner water in another part of the river.

References

Proteidae
Endemic fauna of the United States
Amphibians of the United States
Amphibians described in 1938